Szabina Gercsák (born 9 July 1996) is a Hungarian judoka.

She is the bronze medallist of the 2016 European Judo Championships in the -70 kg category.

References

External links
 
 

1996 births
Living people
Hungarian female judoka
Judoka at the 2014 Summer Youth Olympics
European Games competitors for Hungary
Judoka at the 2015 European Games
Youth Olympic gold medalists for Hungary
21st-century Hungarian women